Enterprise Champion or Enterprise Tsar is a position within the UK Government responsible for promoting entrepreneurship and advising the Department for Business, Innovation and Skills. The role is currently held by Alan Sugar, the well-known entrepreneur and star of BBC One's The Apprentice, who formerly held the position for one year during the Brown ministry (2007–10). During this time, he was ennobled as Lord Sugar.

Sugar was also kept on by Conservative Party prime ministers David Cameron in the 2015 United Kingdom general election and by Theresa May after the Brexit referendum.

References

Government of the United Kingdom
Department for Business, Innovation and Skills